Kenji Yamamoto is the name of:

Kenji Yamamoto (composer, born 1958), known for Dragon Ball music
Kenji Yamamoto (composer, born 1964), known for Metroid music
Kenji Yamamoto (footballer) (born 1965), Japanese former footballer